In commutative algebra, a ring of mixed characteristic is a commutative ring  having characteristic zero and having an ideal  such that  has positive characteristic.

Examples 
 The integers  have characteristic zero, but for any prime number ,  is a finite field with  elements and hence has characteristic .
 The ring of integers of any number field is of mixed characteristic
 Fix a prime p and localize the integers at the prime ideal (p).  The resulting ring Z(p) has characteristic zero.  It has a unique maximal ideal pZ(p), and the quotient Z(p)/pZ(p) is a finite field with p elements. In contrast to the previous example, the only possible characteristics for rings of the form  are zero (when I is the zero ideal) and powers of p (when I is any other non-unit ideal); it is not possible to have a quotient of any other characteristic.
 The p-adic integers Zp for any prime p are a ring of characteristic zero. However, they have an ideal generated by the image of the prime number p under the canonical map . The quotient Zp/pZp is again the finite field of p elements.  Zp is an example of a complete discrete valuation ring of mixed characteristic.
 The integers, the ring of integers of any number field, and any localization or completion of one of these rings is a characteristic zero Dedekind domain.

References

Commutative algebra